The National LGBTQ+ Bar Association, formerly the National Lesbian and Gay Law Association and the National LGBT Bar Association, is a national association of lawyers, judges and other legal professionals, law students, activists, and affiliated lesbian, gay, bisexual, transgender legal organizations. It was formally founded in 1989 and became an official affiliate of the American Bar Association in 1992. The association is headquartered in Washington, D.C., and its current executive director is D’Arcy Kemnitz.

History
The idea of creating a national lesbian and gay bar association was introduced at the 1987 march on Washington, D.C., for lesbian and gay rights. In 1989, at the American Bar Association (ABA) midyear meeting, bylaws for the association were presented and a nonprofit board of directors was formalized.

By the time the second board meeting was held in 1989 in Boston, the LGBTQ+ Bar had 293 paid members. At the meeting, the association initiated a campaign to ask the ABA to include protection based upon sexual orientation to its revision of the Model Code of Judicial Conduct for Judges, which has now been accepted by several states.

In 1992, the LGBTQ+ Bar became an official affiliate of the American Bar Association and now works closely with the ABA's Section on Individual Rights and Responsibilities and its Committee on Sexual Orientation and Gender Identity. 

In January 1995, the LGBTQ+ Bar became the first national organization to unanimously pass a board resolution calling for transgender inclusion in Employment Non-Discrimination Act.

In August 2021, the LGBTQ+ Bar rebranded from the National LGBT Bar Association to the National LGBTQ+ Bar Association. This name change reflects the LGBTQ+ Bar's commitment to diversity, equity, and inclusion and was meant to be inclusive of those in the community who do not identify as lesbian, gay, bisexual, transgender, or queer.

Awards presented by the association
The Dan Bradley Award

The Dan Bradley Award is the National LGBTQ+ Bar Association's highest honor. It recognizes the efforts of a member of the lesbian, gay, bisexual, transgender, and queer legal community whose work, like Attorney Dan Bradley's, has led the way in our struggle for equality under the law. Dan Bradley was the first chair of the American Bar Association Section of Individual Rights and Responsibility's Committee on the Rights of Gay People, now known as the Committee for Sexual Orientation and Gender Identity. Bradley saw the law as a powerful instrument of social justice, and he believed that lawyers had an obligation to use their skills as advocates in the service of the least powerful in society.

Previous Award Winners

Allies for Justice Award

Each year, the National LGBTQ+ Bar Association honors a legal professional who, in their position of leadership, has allied with the LGBTQ+ community and has made a noteworthy contribution to the struggle for civil rights and equality before the law.

Past Allies for Justice Awardees

Out & Proud Corporate Counsel Award

The award is given to legal professionals who promote LGBTQ+ equality through words and actions to create more secure and welcoming workplaces. The award receptions give LGBTQ+ legal professionals and their straight allies the opportunity to honor distinguished colleagues who have worked hard to increase LGBTQ+ diversity awareness in the corporate office and in the community.

Best LGBTQ+ Lawyers Under 40

The LGBTQ+ Bar established this award in 2010 to recognize lesbian, gay, bisexual, transgender, and queer legal professionals under the age of 40 who have distinguished themselves in their field and demonstrated a profound commitment to LGBTQ+ equality.

Michael Greenberg Student Writing Competition

Each year, the National LGBTQ+ Bar Association hosts a writing competition challenging students enrolled in an ABA-accredited law school to submit papers on a cutting edge legal issue affecting the Lesbian, Gay, Bisexual, Transgender, Queer, and/or Intersex community.

Prizes

The National LGBTQ+ Bar Association's Student Leadership Awards

The National LGBTQ+ Bar Association's Student Leadership Awards are presented to graduating or recently graduated law students who have demonstrated a unique level of commitment to serving the LGBTQ+ community throughout their law school careers.

Awardees

See also

List of LGBT-related organizations

References

External links

Lavender Law Conference and Career Fair

American bar associations
LGBT organizations in the United States
LGBT professional associations
1989 establishments in the United States
Organizations established in 1989